The 12th Annual Grammy Awards were held on March 11, 1970. They recognized accomplishments of musicians for the year 1969.

Award winners
Record of the Year
Bones Howe (producer) & The 5th Dimension for "Aquarius/Let the Sunshine In"
Album of the Year
James William Guercio (producer) & Blood, Sweat & Tears for Blood, Sweat & Tears
Song of the Year
Joe South for "Games People Play"
Best New Artist
Crosby, Stills & Nash

Children's
Best Recording for Children
Peter, Paul and Mary for Peter, Paul and Mommy

Classical
Best Classical Performance, Orchestra
Pierre Boulez (conductor) & the Cleveland Orchestra for Boulez Conducts Debussy, Vol. 2 "Images Pour Orchestre"
Best Vocal Soloist Performance, Classical
Thomas Schippers (conductor), Leontyne Price & the New Philharmonia for Barber: Two Scenes From "Antony and Cleopatra"/Knoxville, Summer of 1915
Best Opera Recording
Otto Gerdes (producer), Herbert von Karajan (conductor), Helga Dernesch, Thomas Stolze, Jess Thomas & the Berlin Philharmonic Orchestra for Wagner: Siegfried
Best Choral Performance, Classical (other than opera)
Luciano Berio (conductor), Ward Swingle (choir director), the Swingle Singers & the New York Philharmonic for Berio: Sinfonia
Best Classical Performance - Instrumental Soloist or Soloists (with or without orchestra)
Wendy Carlos for Switched-On Bach
Best Chamber Music Performance
 The Chicago Brass Ensemble, Cleveland Brass Ensemble & Philadelphia Brass Ensemble for Gabrieli: Antiphonal Music of Gabrieli
Album of the Year, Classical
Rachel Elkind (producer) & Wendy Carlos for Switched-On Bach

Comedy
Best Comedy Recording
Bill Cosby for Bill Cosby, aka Sports.

Composing and arranging
Best Instrumental Theme
John Barry (composer) for Midnight Cowboy
Best Original Score Written for a Motion Picture or a Television Special
Burt Bacharach (composer) for Butch Cassidy and the Sundance Kid
Best Instrumental Arrangement
Henry Mancini (arranger) for "Love Theme from Romeo and Juliet"
Best Arrangement Accompanying Vocalist(s)
Fred Lipsius (arranger) for "Spinning Wheel" performed by Blood, Sweat & Tears

Country
Best Country Vocal Performance, Female
Tammy Wynette for Stand By Your Man
Best Country Vocal Performance, Male
Johnny Cash for A Boy Named Sue
Best Country Performance by a Duo or Group
Waylon Jennings & the Kimberlys for MacArthur Park
Best Country Instrumental Performance
The Nashville Brass & Danny Davis for The Nashville Brass Featuring Danny Davis Play More Nashville Sounds
Best Country Song
Shel Silverstein (songwriter) for A Boy Named Sue performed by Johnny Cash

Folk
Best Folk Performance
Joni Mitchell for Clouds

Gospel
Best Gospel Performance
Porter Wagoner & the Blackwood Brothers for In Gospel Country
Best Soul Gospel Performance
Edwin Hawkins for Oh Happy Day performed by the Edwin Hawkins Singers
Best Sacred Performance (Non-Classical)
Jake Hess for Ain't That Beautiful Singing

Jazz
Best Instrumental Jazz Performance, Small Group or Soloist With Small Group
Wes Montgomery for Willow Weep for Me
Best Instrumental Jazz Performance, Large Group or Soloist With Large Group
Quincy Jones for Walking in Space

Musical show
Best Score From an Original Cast Show Album
Burt Bacharach, Hal David (composers), Henry Jerome, Phil Ramone (producers) & the original cast (Jerry Orbach, Jill O'Hara, Edward Winter, Donna McKecknie, A .L. Hines, Marian Mercer & Paul Reed)  for Promises, Promises

Packaging and notes
Best Album Cover
David Stahlberg & Evelyn J. Kelbish (graphic artists) for America the Beautiful performed by Gary McFarland
Best Album Notes
Johnny Cash (notes writer) for Nashville Skyline performed by Bob Dylan

Pop
Best Contemporary Vocal Performance, Female
Peggy Lee for "Is That All There Is?"
Best Contemporary Vocal Performance, Male
Harry Nilsson for "Everybody's Talkin'"
Best Contemporary Vocal Performance by a Group
The 5th Dimension for "Aquarius/Let the Sunshine In"
Best Contemporary Performance by a Chorus
Percy Faith for "Love Theme From "Romeo and Juliet" performed by the Percy Faith Orchestra & Chorus
Best Contemporary Instrumental Performance
Blood, Sweat & Tears for "Variations on a Theme by Eric Satie"
Best Contemporary Song
Joe South for "Games People Play"

Production and engineering
Best Engineered Recording, Non-Classical
Geoff E. Emerick & Phil McDonald (engineers) for Abbey Road performed by The Beatles
Best Engineered Recording, Classical
 Wendy Carlos (engineer & artist) for Switched-On Bach

R&B
Best R&B Vocal Performance, Female
Aretha Franklin for "Share Your Love With Me"
Best R&B Vocal Performance, Male
Joe Simon for "The Chokin' Kind"
Best Rhythm & Blues Performance by a Duo or Group, Vocal or Instrumental
Isley Brothers for "It's Your Thing"
Best R&B Instrumental Performance
King Curtis for "Games People Play"
Best Rhythm & Blues Song
Richard Spencer (songwriter) for "Color Him Father" performed by The Winstons

Spoken
Best Spoken Word Recording
Art Linkletter & Diane Linkletter for We Love You Call Collect

References

 012
1970 in California
1970 in Illinois
1970 in Tennessee
1970 music awards
20th century in Chicago
1970 in Los Angeles
20th century in Nashville, Tennessee
1970 in New York City
1970s in Manhattan
1970 in American music
March 1970 events in the United States